The Minister of Agriculture, Land Reform and Rural Development is a Minister of the Cabinet of South Africa, with political executive responsibility for agriculture, land reform and rural development, as well as for the Agricultural Research Council, the National Agricultural Marketing Council, Onderstepoort Biological Products, the Perishable Products Export Control Board, and Ncera Farms.

The Agriculture, Land Reform and Rural Development portfolio was created in the 2019 cabinet reorganization by President Cyril Ramaphosa; the Minister inherited the responsibility for agriculture from the Minister of Agriculture, Forestry and Fisheries. The last Minister of Agriculture, Forestry and Fisheries was Senzeni Zokwana with Sfiso Buthelezi as his deputy, before the portfolio was changed in May 2019.

List of agriculture ministers

Minister of Agriculture, 1910-1933

Minister of Agriculture and Forestry, 1933-1948

Minister of Agriculture, 1948-1958

Minister of Water Affairs and Agricultural Technical Services, 1958-1966

Minister of Agriculture and Water Affairs, 1966-1968

Minister of Agriculture, 1968-1981

Minister of Agriculture and Fisheries, 1981-1982

Minister of Agriculture, 1982-1991

Minister of Agriculture and Development, 1991-1994

Minister of Agriculture, 1994-1996

Minister of Agriculture and Land Affairs, 1996-2009

Minister of Agriculture, Forestry and Fisheries, 2009-2019

Minister of Agriculture, Land Reform and Rural Development, 2019-present

References

External links
Department of Agriculture, Land Reform and Rural Development

Agriculture, Land Reform and Rural Development
South Africa
Lists of political office-holders in South Africa